Maurino is a rural locality (a village) in Zheleznodorozhnoye Rural Settlement, Sheksninsky District, Vologda Oblast, Russia. The population was 4 as of 2002.

Geography 
Maurino is located 19 km southwest of Sheksna (the district's administrative centre) by road. Yedoma is the nearest locality. There are 3 villages in the region of Maurino and Lake Maurinsko on the same parallel.

References 

Rural localities in Sheksninsky District